The 2000 Amber Valley Borough Council election took place on 4 May 2000 to elect members of Amber Valley Borough Council in Derbyshire, England. The whole council was up for election with boundary changes since the last election in 1999 increasing the number of seats by 2. The Conservative Party gained control of the council from the Labour Party.

Election result
Overall turnout in the election was 31.6%, with a trial in 2 wards seeing a 115% increase in postal voting after anyone was allowed to apply.

Ward results

References

2000 English local elections
2000
2000s in Derbyshire